Susan Wood may refer to:
Susan Wood (television presenter), former news presenter from New Zealand
Susan Wood (literary scholar) (1948–1980), Canadian professor, critic, and science fiction fan
Susan Wood (poet) (born 1946), professor at Rice University
Susan Wood (pharmacologist) (1952–1998), British pharmacologist and medical regulator
Susan Wood (New Zealand writer) (1836–1880)
Susan Buxton Wood (1918–2006), British writer, philanthropist
 Susan Selina Wood, birth name of the New Zealand administrator known as Mimie Wood (1888–1979)

See also
Sue Wood (Suzanne Wood, born 1948), New Zealand politician